George Warwick McClintic (January 14, 1866 – September 25, 1942) was a United States district judge of the United States District Court for the Southern District of West Virginia.

Education and career

Born in Pocahontas County, West Virginia, McClintic received an Artium Baccalaureus degree from Roanoke College in 1883 and a Bachelor of Laws from the University of Virginia School of Law in 1886. He was in private practice in Charleston, West Virginia from 1888 to 1921. He was a member of the West Virginia House of Delegates from 1919 to 1921.

Federal judicial service

On July 19, 1921, McClintic was nominated by President Warren G. Harding to a new seat on the United States District Court for the Southern District of West Virginia created by 42 Stat. 67. He was confirmed by the United States Senate on July 25, 1921, and received his commission the same day. He assumed senior status on March 1, 1941, serving in that capacity until his death on September 25, 1942.

References

Sources
 

1866 births
1942 deaths
Members of the West Virginia House of Delegates
Judges of the United States District Court for the Southern District of West Virginia
United States district court judges appointed by Warren G. Harding
20th-century American judges
Roanoke College alumni
University of Virginia School of Law alumni